Jagannadhapuram is the name of several places in India:

 Jagannadhapuram, Kakinada, Andhra Pradesh
 Jagannadhapuram, Krishna district, Andhra Pradesh
 Jagannadhapuram, Tadepalligudem mandal, Andhra Pradesh
 Jagannadhapuram, Chittoor district, Andhra Pradesh